
Year 859 (DCCCLIX) was a common year starting on Sunday (link will display the full calendar) of the Julian calendar.

Events 
 By place 

 Europe 
 January 15 – Battle of St. Quentin: Frankish forces, led by Humfrid, defeat King Louis the German at Saint-Quentin (Northern France). Humfrid is enfeoffed with the County of Autun, and appointed Margrave of Burgundy, by King Charles the Bald.
 Summer – The Viking chieftains Hastein and Björn Ironside (a son of Ragnar Lodbrok) begin an expedition, and sail from the Loire River with a fleet of 62 ships, to raid cities and monasteries in the Mediterranean Sea.
 Viking raiders invade the Kingdom of Pamplona (Western Pyrenees), and capture King García Íñiguez I, somewhere in the Andalusian heartland. They extort a ransom, rising to around 70,000 gold dinars.
 The Russian city of Novgorod is first mentioned in the Sofia Chronicles.
 Winter – The weather is so severe that the Adriatic Sea freezes, and Italy is covered in snow for 100 days.

 Iberian Peninsula 
 Battle of Albelda: King Ordoño I of Asturias, and his ally García Íñiguez I, defeat the Muslims under Musa ibn Musa al-Qasawi at Albelda. 
 Viking raiders burn the mosques of Seville and Algeciras in al-Andalus (modern Spain).

 Africa 
 The University of Al Karaouine is founded in Fes (modern Morocco), by Fatima al-Fihri (recognized by the Guinness Book of World Records as the oldest university in the world).

 China 
 September 7 – Emperor Xuān Zong (Li Yi) dies after a 13-year reign. He is succeeded by his eldest son Yi Zong, as ruler of the Tang Dynasty. 

 Syria 
859 Syrian coast earthquake. It affected the Mediterranean coast of Syria It caused almost the complete destruction of Latakia and Jableh, major damage at Antioch and led to many deaths.

Births 
 Al-Hadi ila'l-Haqq Yahya, first Zaydi Imam of Yemen (d. 911)
 Ali ibn Isa al-Jarrah, vizier of the Abbasid Caliphate (d. 946)
 Odo I, king of the West Frankish Kingdom (or 860)
 Rudolph I, king of Burgundy (d. 912)
 Tannet of Pagan, king of Burma (d. 904)

Deaths 
 September 7 – Xuān Zong, emperor of the Tang Dynasty (b. 810)
 December 13 – Angilbert II, archbishop of Milan
 Dhul-Nun al-Misri, Egyptian scholar and Sufi (b. 796)
 Immo, bishop of Noyon (approximate date)
 Lu Shang, chancellor of the Tang Dynasty (b. 789)
 Máel Gualae, king of Munster (Ireland)

References

Sources